Andrew Oliver (March 28, 1706 – March 3, 1774) was a merchant and public official in the Province of Massachusetts Bay.  Born into a wealthy and politically powerful merchant family, he is best known as the Massachusetts official responsible for implementing the provisions of the Stamp Act, for which he was hanged in effigy.  He never actually carried out those duties, and was later commissioned as the province's lieutenant governor.

Early life
Andrew Oliver was born in Boston, capital of the British Province of Massachusetts Bay, on March 28, 1706.  His father, Daniel Oliver, was a wealthy and politically active merchant, and his mother, Elizabeth Belcher Oliver, was the sister of Jonathan Belcher, son of another wealthy merchant and governor of the province in the 1730s.  Andrew had two brothers: Daniel Oliver (1704–1727) and Peter Oliver (1713–1791).  Characterized as "sober and pious", Andrew was sent to Harvard College, where he graduated in 1724.

Oliver then entered the family business, setting up a merchant business with his brother Peter that concentrated on wine and textiles.  The business was successful, and the brothers eventually controlled Boston's Long Wharf.  On March 20, 1728, Oliver married Mary Fitch, the daughter of Colonel Thomas Fitch.  The couple had three children before Mary died in 1732; only one, a son named Andrew, survived to adulthood.  After Mary's death Oliver traveled to England, returning to Massachusetts in 1734.  On December 19, 1734, he married Mary Sanford of Newport, Rhode Island, the sister-in-law of Thomas Hutchinson.  The couple had fourteen children.

Politics and the Stamp Act
In 1737 Oliver entered politics, winning election as Boston's town auditor.  He held many other local offices, and became a leader of the Hutchinson-Oliver faction, which dominated politics in colonial Massachusetts. He was elected to the provincial assembly in 1742, and in 1755 was appointed provincial secretary by Acting Governor Spencer Phips.

In 1765, Oliver was commissioned to administer the unpopular Stamp Act in Massachusetts. He was privately against the act, but told people he was in favor of it, leading colonists to rise against him. On August 14, he was hanged in effigy from Boston's Liberty Tree in a protest organized by the Loyal Nine, a precursor to the Sons of Liberty. That night his house and offices were ransacked by an angry crowd. On August 17, he was compelled to publicly resign his commission. On December 17, the Sons of Liberty again forced him to publicly swear that he would never act as stamp distributor.

Later career

He was commissioned lieutenant governor of the colony when his brother-in-law Thomas Hutchinson became governor in 1771.  Letters that he and Hutchinson wrote in the late 1760s during protests surrounding the Townshend Acts were published in 1773, igniting a storm of protest against both men.  The business took a serious toll on Oliver's health, which suffered further after his wife died.  Oliver died on March 3, 1774, after suffering from an "apoplectick fit".  His death was greeted with glee by the Sons of Liberty, and his burial was marred by acts of protest and violence.  Because of the charged political climate few friends and relatives attended.

Most of Oliver's family remained Loyal during the American Revolution, and resettled in other parts of the British Empire.

Notes

References

Calhoon, Robert M. "Oliver, Andrew". American National Biography Online, February 2000.

External links

 Museum of Fine Arts, Boston. Portrait of Daniel, Peter and Andrew Oliver, by John Smibert, 1732.

1706 births
1774 deaths
Harvard College alumni
Harvard College Loyalists in the American Revolution
Colonial American merchants
People from colonial Boston
Lieutenant Governors of colonial Massachusetts
Members of the colonial Massachusetts House of Representatives
Members of the colonial Massachusetts Governor's Council
American Loyalists from Massachusetts
18th-century American politicians